Animal Kingdom: Let's Go Ape, also titled Evolution Man and Why I Did (Not) Eat My Father, is a 2015 computer-animated adventure comedy film directed by Jamel Debbouze in collaboration with producer Fred Fougea. The film is based on the 1960 novel The Evolution Man by Roy Lewis from an original screenplay by Fred Fougea and Jean-Luc Fromental. An English dub of the film was made, but was cut 22 minutes shorter for its dark tones towards children.

Voice cast
 Jamel Debbouze and Ben Bishop (English dub) as Édouard.
 Mélissa Theuriau and Sohm Kapila (English dub) as Lucie.
 Arié Elmaleh and Ray Gillon (English dub) as Ian.
 Patrice Thibaud and Wayne Forester (English dub Vladimir) as Vladimir / and Geoff Searle (English dub Sergey) Sergey.
 Christian Hecq and Ray Gillon (English dub) as Siméon.
 Youssef Hajdi and Ray Gillon (English dub) as Marcel.
 Adrien Antoine and Ben Bishop (English dub) as Vania.
 Diouc Koma as Vania. (motion-capture)
 Johanna Hilaire and Julia Boecker (English dub) as Gudule.
 Dorothée Pousséo and Melanie Cooper (English dub) as Myrtille.
 Dominique Magloire and Georgina Lamb (English dub) as Mamacita.
 Enzo Ratsito and Beau Thomas (English dub) as Diego.
 Charlotte des Georges and Melanie Cooper (English dub Fleura) as Fleura / and Anjella Mackintosh as (English dub Victoire) as Victoire.
 Nathalie Homs and Georgina Lamb (English dub) as The Witch.
 Georgette Kala-Lobé as The Witch. (motion-capture)
 Cyril Casmèze and Jack Cooke (English dub) as Hubert.
 Dominique Magloire and Georgina Lamb (English dub) as Mamacita.
 D'Jal and Tracey Ayer (English dub) as The Prehistoric Portuguese.

Reception
Animal Kingdom: Let's Go Ape received positive reviews in France, while the movie had negative reviews internationally for its uncanny valley appearances, some critics considered the film as it copied elements from The Lion King and The Croods. It earned a 4.9 on IMDb.

References

External links
 

2015 films
2015 3D films
2015 comedy films
2015 computer-animated films
2010s French animated films
2010s children's adventure films
2010s children's comedy films
2010s children's animated films
2010s adventure comedy films
2010s French-language films
2010s Italian-language films
Belgian animated films
Belgian children's films
Belgian adventure films
Belgian comedy films
Chinese 3D films
Chinese computer-animated films
Chinese children's films
Chinese adventure comedy films
French 3D films
French computer-animated films
French children's adventure films
French children's comedy films
French adventure comedy films
Italian 3D films
Italian animated films
Italian children's films
Italian adventure comedy films
Jungle adventure films
Animated adventure films
Animated comedy films
3D animated films
Chinese-language films
Animated films based on British novels
Animated films about cavemen
Animated films about gorillas
Films set in Africa
Animated films set in prehistory
Films set in jungles
Pathé films
2010s French films